The Earle K. Plyler Prize for Molecular Spectroscopy and Dynamics is a prize that has been awarded annually by the American Physical Society since 1977. The recipient is chosen for "notable contributions to the field of molecular spectroscopy and dynamics". The prize is named after Earle K. Plyler, who was a leading experimenter in the field of infrared spectroscopy; as of 2007 it is valued at $10,000.  The prize is currently sponsored by the AIP Journal of Chemical Physics.

Recipients 
Source: American Physical Society

See also
 List of physics awards
 List of chemistry awards

References

External links 
 Earle K. Plyler Prize for Molecular Spectroscopy and Dynamics, American Physical Society

Awards of the American Physical Society
Chemistry awards
Spectroscopy
Awards established in 1977